The black-and-white langur (Presbytis bicolor) is a species of monkey in the family Cercopithecidae.  It was formerly considered a subspecies of the Black-crested Sumatran langur, Presbytis melalophos (as Presbytis melalophos bicolor) but genetic analysis revealed that these are separate species.

Distribution
The black-and-white langur is native to the island of Sumatra in Indonesia.  It is listed as data deficient by the IUCN.

References

Presbytis
Primates of Indonesia
Endemic fauna of Sumatra
Mammals described in 1992